The 2007 Nasarawa State gubernatorial election was the 3rd gubernatorial election of Nasarawa State. Held on April 14, 2007, the People's Democratic Party nominee Aliyu Doma won the election, defeating Solomon Sunday Akku of the All Nigeria Peoples Party.

Results 
A total of 11 candidates contested in the election. Aliyu Doma from the People's Democratic Party won the election, defeating Solomon Sunday Akku from the All Nigeria Peoples Party. Registered voters was 1,001,423.

References 

Nasarawa State gubernatorial elections
Nasarawa gubernatorial
April 2007 events in Nigeria